The Seyferth–Gilbert homologation is a chemical reaction of an aryl ketone 1 (or aldehyde) with dimethyl (diazomethyl)phosphonate 2 and potassium tert-butoxide to give substituted alkynes 3. Dimethyl (diazomethyl)phosphonate 2 is often called the Seyferth–Gilbert reagent.

This reaction is called a homologation because the product has exactly one additional carbon more than the starting material.

Reaction mechanism
Deprotonation of the Seyferth–Gilbert reagent A gives an anion B, which reacts with the ketone to form the oxaphosphetane D. Elimination of dimethylphosphate E gives the vinyl diazo-intermediate Fa and Fb. The generation of nitrogen gas gives a vinyl carbene G, which via a 1,2-migration forms the desired alkyne H.

Bestmann modification

The dimethyl (diazomethyl)phosphonate carbanion can be generated in situ from dimethyl-1-diazo-2-oxopropylphosphonate (also called the Ohira-Bestmann reagent) by reaction with methanol and potassium carbonate as the base by cleavage of the acetyl group as methyl acetate. Reaction of Bestmann's reagent with aldehydes gives terminal alkynes often in very high yield and fewer steps than the Corey–Fuchs reaction.

The use of the milder potassium carbonate makes this procedure much more compatible with a wide variety of functional groups.

Improved in situ generation of the Ohira-Bestmann reagent 

Recently a safer and more scalable approach has been developed for the synthesis of alkynes from aldehydes. This protocol takes advantage of a stable sulfonyl azide, rather than tosyl azide, for the in situ generation of the Ohira−Bestmann reagent.

Other modifications 
Another modification for less reactive aldehydes is made by replacement of potassium carbonate with caesium carbonate in MeOH and results in a drastic yield increase.

See also
Corey–Fuchs reaction
Horner–Wadsworth–Emmons reaction
Wittig reaction

References

Carbon-carbon bond forming reactions
Rearrangement reactions
Name reactions